Riccardo Bocalon (born 3 March 1989) is an Italian professional footballer who plays as a striker for  club Mantova.

Career

Treviso
Born in Venice, Veneto, Bocalon started his career with Treviso. In January 2008, he was signed by Internazionale along with Jacopo Fortunato in co-ownership deals, for €450,000 each, but Bocalon was loaned back to Treviso. He then made his Serie B debut with Treviso. In June 2008, Inter bought the remain 50% registration rights of Bocalon and Fortunato outright for €900,000 in total.

Internazionale
With the under-20 team of Internazionale in 2008–09 season, he was the third striker, behind Aiman Napoli and Mattia Destro.

In summer 2009, he was loaned to Porto Summaga and won Lega Pro Prima Divisione. Inter team-mate Gabriele Puccio also joined Portogruaro in co-ownership deal.

In June 2010, the two players remained in Portogruaro. On 20 January 2011 he joined Viareggio.

In July 2011 he joined U.S. Cremonese along with Michele Rigione. On 31 January 2012 he was signed by Carpi F.C. 1909. In summer 2012 he was signed by South Tyrol along with Mame Baba Thiam. He was suffered from injury and missed 3 months. On 29 January 2013 he left the club again.

Venezia
Bocalon joined his home-town club Venezia in January 2013 and has contributed significantly to the team's promotion to Lega Pro Prima Divisione. On 16 June 2013 he scored 2 goals in the second leg of the playoff final against Monza, levelling the score on the 50th minute and then again on the 85th minute of the match. He then set up D'Appolonia for the third goal on 95 minutes that secured Venezia's victory and promotion. On 19 July 2013 he joined Venezia in co-ownership deal in 2-year contract. In June 2014 Inter bought back Bocalon.

Prato
In August 2014, Bocalon joined Prato from Internazionale for the partnership agreement between the two clubs.

Alessandria
In June 2015, Alessandria bought the player for €300,000 fee; Bocalon signed a three-year contract.

Salernitana
On 31 July 2017, Bocalon was transferred to Salernitana in a definitive deal. He signed a three-year contract. He was assigned the number 24 shirt.

Return to Venezia
On 31 January 2019, he returned to Venezia, signing a 3.5-year contract. In the 2020–21 Serie B promotion play-offs, he scored the decisive goal in added time of the second leg against Cittadella that secured Venezia's promotion to Serie A. However, he did not make any appearances in Serie A for Venezia in the 2021–22 season.

Loan to Pordenone
On 15 January 2020, he joined Serie B club Pordenone on loan with an option to buy.

Trento
On 4 February 2022, Bocalon moved to Trento in Serie C.

Mantova
On 11 January 2023, Bocalon signed with Mantova.

References

External links
 
 

Living people
1989 births
Footballers from Venice
Association football forwards
Italian footballers
Treviso F.B.C. 1993 players
Inter Milan players
A.S.D. Portogruaro players
U.S. Cremonese players
F.C. Esperia Viareggio players
F.C. Südtirol players
U.S. Salernitana 1919 players
Venezia F.C. players
Pordenone Calcio players
A.C. Trento 1921 players
Mantova 1911 players
Serie B players
Serie C players